This is a list of UNICEF Goodwill Ambassadors and advocates, who work on behalf of the United Nations International Children's Emergency Fund for children's rights. UNICEF goodwill ambassadors are usually selected by regional and national UNICEF offices, the primary office at the United Nations building in New York is responsible for international appointments. UNICEF has the largest and most extensive goodwill ambassador and human rights advocacy program in the world for children.

International ambassadors and advocates

In order of appointment:

  Tetsuko Kuroyanagi (February 1984)
  Harry Belafonte (March 1987)
  Nana Mouskouri (October 1993)
  Leon Lai (July 1994)
  Vanessa Redgrave (June 1995)
  Judy Collins (September 1995)
  Maxim Vengerov (July 1997)
  Susan Sarandon (December 1999)
  Mia Farrow (September 2000)
  Sebastião Salgado (April 2001)
  Femi Kuti (June 2002)
  Angélique Kidjo (July 2002)
  Whoopi Goldberg (September 2003)
  Shakira (October 2003)
  Ricky Martin (December 2003)
  Jackie Chan (April 2004)
  Lang Lang (May 2004)
  Danny Glover (September 2004)
  David Beckham (January 2005)
  Amitabh Bachchan (April 2005)
  Queen Rania of Jordan (January 2007)
  Maria Teresa, Grand Duchess of Luxembourg (April 2007)
  Gavin Rajah (August 2007)
  Berliner Philharmoniker (November 2007)
  Simon Rattle (November 2007)
  Biyouna (November 2012)
  Ishmael Beah (November 2007)
  Myung-whun Chung (April 2008)
  Maria Guleghina (February 2009)
  Orlando Bloom (October 2009)
  Lionel Messi (March 2010)
  Yuna Kim (July 2010)
  Liam Neeson (March 2011)
  Serena Williams (September 2011)
  Katy Perry (December 2013)
  Novak Djokovic (August 2015)
 Priyanka Chopra (December 2016)
  Lilly Singh (July 2017)
  Millie Bobby Brown (November 2018)
  Vanessa Nakate (September 2022)

Former ambassadors

In order of appointment:

Regional ambassadors
In order of appointment:

South Asia
  Aamir Khan (October 2014)
  Sachin Tendulkar (November 2013)

Central and Eastern Europe
  Anatoly Karpov (June 1988)
  Milena Zupančič (1998)

Latin America
  Diego Torres (November 2006)
  Ricardo Montaner (November 2007)

Middle East and North Africa

  Mahmoud Kabil (January 2004)
  Nancy Ajram (October 2009)

Eastern and Southern Africa
 Yvonne Chaka Chaka (April 2005)
 Zola (November 2006)
 Name Six (May 2007)
 Oliver Mtukudzi (June 2011)
 Tendai Mtawarira (2022)

Francophone countries
 Patrick Poivre d'Arvor (January 2007)

East Asia and Pacific

 Miriam Yeung (October 2009)
 Merewalesi Nailatikau (February 2011)
 Aaron Kwok (October 2011)
 Agnes Chan (2016)
 Choi Siwon (October 2019)
 Gladys Habu (2021)

National ambassadors
In order of appointment:

Afghanistan 
 Raees Ahmadzai (September 2011)
 Rashid Khan (March 2019)

Algeria 
 Madjid Bougherra (January 2011)
 Salima Souakri (October 2011)

Andorra 
 Gerard Claret (November 2010)
 Albert Llovera (November 2010)

Argentina 
 Julián Weich (2000)
 Manu Ginóbili (August 2007)
 Natalia Oreiro (September 2011)

Armenia 
 Alla Levonyan (April 2007)
 Henrikh Mkhitaryan (9 November 2016)
 Artur Aleksanyan (2019)

Australia 
 Callan McAuliffe (2013)
 Adam Liaw (August 2013)
 Steven Solomon (2013)
 Carrie Bickmore (2012)
 Brett Emerton (2012)
 Morris Gleitzman (2011)
 The Wiggles (2008)
 Tara Moss (2008)
 Geoffrey Rush (2006)
 Jimmy Barnes (2004)
 John Doyle (1993)
 Greig Pickhaver (1993)
 Ken Done (1988)

Austria 
 Christiane Hörbiger (2003)
 Thomas Brezina (1996)

Azerbaijan 
 Teimour Radjabov (May 2006)

Bangladesh 
 Arifa Zaman Moushumi (September 2013)
 Jewel Aich (September 2013)
 Shakib Al Hasan (September 2013)

Belarus 
 Vladimir Pougatch (November 2014)
 Max Mirnyi (November 2011)

Belgium 
 Henri PFR (2019)
 Nafissatou Thiam (2017)
 Tom Waes (2014)
 Helmut Lotti (1997)

Benin 
 Zeynab (September 2007)

Bolivia 
 Juan Carlos 'Chavo' Salvatierra (May 2014)

Bosnia and Herzegovina 
 Edin Džeko (November 2009)

Brazil 

 Mauricio de Sousa (November 2007)
 Felipe Massa, (October 2007)
 Lázaro Ramos (July 2009)
 Mônica (November 2007)
 Daniela Mercury (October 1995)
 Renato Aragão (September 1991)

Bulgaria 
 Vladimir Ampov - Grafa (September 2014)
 Ani Salich (November 2006)

Canada 
 Bayan Yammout (2011)
 Elizabeth Dallaire (2007)
 GFORCE (2019)
 Karina LeBlanc (2013)
 Jan Lisiecki (2008)
 John Nsabimana (2008)
 Simu Liu (2020)
 Solange Tuyishime (2010)
 Veronica Tennant (1992)

Chile 
 Iván Zamorano (1998)
 Benjamín Vicuña (January 2008)

China 
 Maggie Cheung (April 2010)
 Yang Lan (April 2010)
 Chen Kun (April 2012)
 Roy Wang (November 2018)

Colombia 
Andrés Cepeda (10 November 2017)
 Aida Morales (5 December 2016)
 Belky Arizala (5 December 2016)
 Carolina Cruz (5 December 2016)
 Daniella Álvarez (5  December 2016)
 Johanna Morales (5 December 2016)
 Iván Lalinde (5 December 2016)
 Karin Jiménez (5 December 2016)
 Marcela Carvajal (5 December 2016)
 Mónica Rodriguez (5 December 2016)
 Nairo Quintana (5 December 2016)
 Natalia Jerez (5 December 2016)
 Pedro Ruiz (5 December 2016)
 Santiago Arias (5 December 2016)
 Nicole Regnier (March 2014)
 Carlos Vives, Claudia Elena Vasquez, Elena Vives Vasquez, The Family, August 2009

Croatia 
 Zlatan Stipišić Gibonni (July 2003)
 Bojana Gregorić (August 2004)
 Maja Vučić (November 2006)
 Slaven Bilić (February 2009)
 Mirna Medakovic Stepinac (1 December 2018)

Cuba 
 Ernán López-Nussa (1995)
 La Colmenita (2007)
 Raúl Paz (2009)
 X-Alfonso (2010)
 Litz Alfonso (December 2011)

Cyprus 
 Nasos Ktorides (February 2012)

Czech Republic 
 Patrik Eliáš (August 2006)
 Michal Viewegh (February 2011)
 Jitka Čvančarová (February 2015)

Democratic Republic of Congo 
 Lomana Trésor LuaLua (June 2009)

Denmark 
 Skæg (August 2016)
 Sofie Østergaard (August 2017)
 Kurt Flemming
 Bubber
 Peter Frödin
 Trine Dyrholm
 Caroline Henderson
 Anders W. Berthelsen
 Sebastian Dorset
 Mek Pek
 Rune Klan
 Birthe Kjær

Dominican Republic 
 Jatnna Tavarez (October 2010)

Ecuador 
 Karla Kanora (November 2012)
 Antonio Valencia (May 2012)

Egypt 
 Khaled Abol Naga (April 2007)

Estonia 
 Maarja-Liis Ilus (1999)
 Eri Klas (1999)
 Erki Nool (1999)
 Children's Music Studio of Estonian Television (November 2009)

Ethiopia 
 Aster Aweke (October 2010)
 Abelone Melese (November 2014)

Finland 
 Eija Ahvo, actress/singer (1986)
 Susanna Haavisto, actress/singer (1986)
 Katri Helena, singer (1990)
 Anna Hanski, singer (1993)
 Iiro Rantala, musician (1993)
 Jorma Uotinen, dancer (1993)
 Eija Vilpas, actress (1993)
 Micke Rejström, actor/juggler (1996)
 Eppu Nuotio, actress/writer (2002)
 Jyrki Linnankivi (Jyrki69), musician (2005)
 Iina Kuustonen, actress (2012)

France 
 Bernard Lama (2004)
 Orchestre Philharmonique de Radio France (2007)
 Oxmo Puccino (October 2012)
 Laëtitia Casta (November 2016)
 Thomas Pesquet

Gambia 
 Jaliba Kuyateh (December 2006)

Georgia 
 Paata Burchuladze (December 2010)
 Nikoloz Rachveli (June 2018)

Germany 
 Mats Hummels ( February 2017)
 Alexander Gerst (2014)
 Dirk Nowitzki (September 2013)
 Nina Ruge (November 2012)
 Eva Padberg (October 2012)
 Sabine Christiansen (1997)

Ghana 
 Marcel Desailly (August 2007)

Greece 
 Helene Glykatzi-Ahrweiler (May 1991)
 George Perris (June 2022)
 Helena Paparizou (2021)

Guinea  
 Sekouba Bambino (May 2018)

Guinea Bissau  
 Tchuma Bari (December 2016)
 Eneida Marta (December 2013)

Hong Kong 
 Adam Wong Sau-ping (January 2017)
 Guo Jing-jing (January 2014)
 Trey Lee Chui-yee (September 2012)
 Sarah Lee Wai-sze (March 2013)
 Wong Kam-po (July 2011)
 Eric Suen (August 2009)
 Karen Mok (2004)
 Charlie Yeung (April 2004)
 Gigi Leung (2002)

Hungary 
 Krisztina D.Tóth (2014)

India 
 Sachin Tendulkar (November 2013)
 Ayushman Khurana (February 2023)

Indonesia 

  (2004)
 Nicholas Saputra (2019)

Iran 
 Mahtab Keramati (August 2006)

Iraq 
 Kadhum Al-Sahir (May 2011)

Ireland 

 Pierce Brosnan (2001)
 Cathy Kelly (2005)
 Stephen Rea (2005)
 Dustin the Turkey (2009)
 Donncha O'Callaghan (2009)
 Joe Canning (September 2010)
 Dermot Earley (September 2010)
 Rory McIlroy (March 2011)

Israel 
 David Broza (June 2012)

Italy 
 Simona Marchini (1987)
 Vigili del Fuoco (1989)
 Roberto Bolle (1999)
 Lino Banfi (2000)
 Francesco Totti (2003)
 Deborah Compagnoni (2003)
 Piccolo Coro dell' Antoniano (2003)
 Mario Porfito (2004)
 Maria Rosaria Omaggio (2005)
 Niky Francisco (2006)
 Paola Saluzzi (2006)
 Alberto Angela (September 2011)
 Angela Finocchiaro (May 2012)

Jamaica 
 Shelly-Ann Fraser-Pryce (February 2010)

Japan 
 Makoto Hasebe (2016)
 Asa Matsuoka (1950–1966)

Kenya 
 Effie Owuor (1997)

Kuwait 
 Suad Abdullah (November 2002)

Latvia 
 Marija Naumova (December 2005)

Liechtenstein 
 Tina Weirather (January 2019)

Lithuania 
 Julian Rachlin (January 2010)

Luxembourg 
 Liz May (April 2010)

Malaysia 
 Upin & Ipin (March 2013)
 Lisa Surihani (February 2017)

Mali 
 Habib Koité (May 2010)

Mexico 
 César Costa (August 2004)
 Julieta Venegas (September 2009)
 Javier Hernández (May 2012)
 Thalía (July 2016)

Mongolia 
 Tumur Ariuna (June 2001)
 Asashōryū Dagvadorj (November 2003)

Montenegro 
 Rambo Amadeus (October 2006)

Morocco 
 Hanane El Fadili (July 2010)

Mozambique 
 Neyma (2014)

Namibia 
 Frank Fredericks (September 2005)
 Agnes Samaria (September 2005)

Nepal 
 Ani Choying Drolma (April 2014)

Netherlands 
 Paul van Vliet (1992)
 Monique van de Ven (1996)
 Sipke Jan Bousema (2002)
 Trijntje Oosterhuis (2004)
 Jörgen Raymann (2005)
 Edwin Evers (2005)
 Renate Verbaan (2010)
 Claudia de Breij (April 2012)
 Ranomi Kromowidjojo (June 2013)
 Klaas van Kruistum (2017)

New Zealand 
 Gareth and Joanne Morgan (2007)
 Mike Roberts
 Roger Hall

Nigeria 
 Nwankwo Kanu (June 2005)

Norway 
 Ole Gunnar Solskjær (2001)
 Sissel Kyrkjebø (November 2005)
 Kjetil André Aamodt (2007)

Pakistan 
 Faisal Kapadia and Bilal Maqsood (Strings) (September 2005)
 Mahira Khan, actress (November 2019)

Paraguay 
 Menchi Barriocanal (July 2005)

Peru 
 Gian Marco Zignago (February 2006)
 Dina Páucar (May 2008)
 Gastón Acurio (August 2009)
 Mónica Sánchez (September 2011)

Philippines 

 Gary Valenciano (1997)
 Anne Curtis

Poland 
 Majka Jeżowska (2003)
 Małgorzata Foremniak (2006)
 Artur Żmijewski (2007)
 Natalia Kukulska (2007)
 Magdalena Różczka (2010)
 Robert Lewandowski(2014)
 Robert Korzeniowski (2017)
 Łukasz Nowicki (2018)
 Agnieszka Radwańska (2019)

Portugal 
 Pedro Couceiro (April 1995)
 Luís Figo (2003)
 Mariza (October 2005)

Romania 
 Horia Tecău (April 2017)
 Andreea Marin (December 2006)
 Gheorghe Hagi (September 2008)
 Smiley (November 2013)

Russia 
 Oxana Fedorova (2007)
 Dmitry Fedorov (Representative for Work of Goodwill Ambassadors) (June 2019)

Serbia 
 Jelena Janković (December 2007)
 Ana Ivanovic (September 2007)
 Aleksandar Đorđević (January 2005)

Slovakia 
 Jaro Bekr (October 2015)
 Kamila Magálová (1995)
 Stanislav Štepka (2001)
 Martin Pyco Rausch (2011)

South Africa 
 Quinton Fortune (March 2004)
 Gavin Rajah (August 2007)

South Korea 
Choi Siwon (2015)
 Jang Sa-ik (2015)
 Kim Hye-soo (2012)
 Shin Kyung-sook (2012)
 Lee Byung-hun (2003)
 Richard Yongjae O'Neill (2008)
 Gong Yoo (2013)
 Ji Sung (2017)
 Kim Rae-won (2007)
 Won Bin (2007)
 Lee Bo-young (2008)
 Sohn Pum-Soo (October 1999)
 Mee-Hwa Kim (December 1999)
 Myung-wha Chung (December 1999)
 Hwang Byung-Ki (December 1996)
 Ahn Sung-ki (May 1993)

Spain 
 Joan Manuel Serrat (March 1998)
 Emilio Aragón (March 2000)
 Imanol Arias (May 2000)
 Pedro Delgado (September 2000)
 Ana Duato (December 2000)
  (December 2000)
 Eusebio Sacristán (December 2002)
 Pau Gasol (May 2003)
 Silvia Abascal (September 2003)
 María Bayo (January 2004)
 Fernando Alonso (March 2005)
 Rafael Guijosa (March 2005)
 Los Lunnis (March 2005)
 Sergio Ramos (June 2014)
 José Calderón (August 2014)
 David Bisbal (April 2017)

St. Lucia 
 Taj Weekes (November 2013)

Sudan 
 Nancy Agag (December 2016)

Sweden 

 Lill Lindfors (1998)
 Kajsa Bergqvist (2005)
 Eva Röse (2007)
 Mark Levengood (2008)
 Jenny Strömstedt (2015)

Switzerland  and Liechtenstein 
  (October 2004)
 Anatole Taubman (December 2018)

Thailand 
 Anand Panyarachun (January 1996)

Turkey 
 Gülsin Onay (November 2003)
 Tayfun Talipoğlu (November 2006)
 Müjdat Gezen (November 2007)
 Ayşe Kulin (November 2007)
 İbrahim Kutluay (March 2008)
 Türkan Şoray (March 2010)
 Kıvanç Tatlıtuğ (March 2011)
 Tuba Büyüküstün (May 2014)

United Kingdom 

Tara McDonald 1988 the youngest child ambassador after winning the Danny Kaye Award hosted by Audrey Hepburn
 Manchester United F.C. (1999)
 Robbie Williams (2000)
 Jemima Khan (2001)
 Andrew O'Hagan (2001)
 Martin Bell (2001)
 Alex Ferguson (2002)
 Trudie Styler (2004)
 Paul Clark (2004)
 Ewan McGregor (2004)
 Elle Macpherson (2005)
 James Nesbitt (2006)
 Ryan Giggs (2006)
 Claudia Schiffer (2006)
 Charley Boorman (2008)
 David Puttnam (2009)
 Duncan Bannatyne (2009)
 Orlando Bloom (2009)
 Matt Dawson (2009)
 Cat Deeley (2009)
 Eddie Izzard (July 2013)
 Chris Hoy (October 2013)
 Tom Hiddleston (2013)
 Michael Sheen (October 2014)
 Emma Bunton (2014)
 Millie Bobby Brown (November 2018)
 Rita Ora (May 2019)

United States of America 

 Laurence Fishburne (1996)
 Sarah Jessica Parker (1998)
 Susan Sarandon (1999)
 Marcus Samuelsson (2000)
 Téa Leoni (2001)
 Alyssa Milano (2003)
 Lucy Liu (2005)
 Dayle Haddon (2007)
 Joel Madden (2008)
 Selena Gomez (2009)
 Vern Yip (November 2010)
 Angie Harmon (January 2013)
 Tyson Chandler (November 2013)
 Katy Perry (December 2013)
Aidan Gallagher (June 2018)
Sofia Carson (October 2020)

Uruguay 
 Diego Forlán (2005)
 Natalia Oreiro (September 2011)
 María Noel Riccetto (November 2019)

Vanuatu 
 Vanuatu Women's Beach Volleyball Team (June 2015)

Venezuela 
 FESNOJIV (November 2004)
 Omar Vizquel (December 2008)
 Édgar Ramírez (November 2010)
 Alejandro Cañizales (July 2011)

Vietnam 
 Vũ Nguyễn Hà Anh (August 2010)
 Nguyễn Xuân Bắc (September 2012)

Zimbabwe 
 Prudence Mabhena (October 2011)

See also
 Goodwill Ambassador
 FAO Goodwill Ambassador
 UNDP Goodwill Ambassador
 UNHCR Goodwill Ambassador
 UNESCO Goodwill Ambassador
 UNODC Goodwill Ambassador
 UNFPA Goodwill Ambassador
 UN Women Goodwill Ambassador
 UNIDO Goodwill Ambassador
 WHO Goodwill Ambassador
 United Nations Messengers of Peace

References

External links
 UNICEF Goodwill Ambassadors
 UNICEF Homepage UNICEF
 UN's Goodwill Hunters, BBC News, 20 March 2000

UNICEF
Goodwill ambassador programmes
United Nations goodwill ambassadors